The 1979 Cal State Fullerton Titans football team represented California State University, Fullerton as a member of the Pacific Coast Athletic Association (PCAA) during the 1979 NCAA Division I-A football season. Led by Jim Colletto in his fifth and final season as head coach, Cal State Fullerton finished the season with an overall record of 3–8 and a mark of 1–4 in conference play, placing fifth in the PCAA. The Titans played home games at Falcon Stadium on the campus of Cerritos College in Norwalk, California.

After the season, San Jose State was found to have used an ineligible player in three of their victories and one tie, and had to forfeit those games. One of the forfeited victories was to Cal State Fullerton, which improved the Titan's record to 4–7 overall and 2–3 in conference play, and put the two team info fourth-place tie in the PCAA standings.

Schedule

Roster

Team players in the NFL
No Cal State Fullerton Titans were selected in the 1980 NFL Draft.

The following finished their college career in 1979, were not drafted, but played in the NFL.

References

Cal State Fullerton
Cal State Fullerton Titans football seasons
Cal State Fullerton Titans football